Claremont Tunnel, also known as the Claremont Water Tunnel is a utility tunnel in Alameda County, in the U.S. state of California near the historic Claremont Hotel. The tunnel crosses the Hayward Fault and carries water for 800,000 EBMUD customers.

History
The Claremont Tunnel was built in 1929.

After the Loma Prieta earthquake in 1989, EBMUD began studying the potential effect of a large seismic event along the Hayward Fault. In the worst-case scenario, slip along the fault would sever the tunnel, disrupting the water supply to approximately 50 to 70% (800,000) of EBMUD's customers for up to six months. In response, EBMUD approved a $189 million Seismic Improvement Plan in 1994, which included seismic upgrades to the Claremont Tunnel. Seismic upgrades began in 2004 and completed in 2007.

Design
The original tunnel connects the EBMUD treatment plant in Orinda with the distribution system west of the Oakland Hills. At peak capacity, the tunnel can deliver .

For the seismic upgrade, a reinforced bypass tunnel was constructed across the Hayward Fault starting in 2004. The seismic upgrade also injected grout to improve contact between the 1929 concrete tunnel and the surrounding earth. For the bypass, first a  access tunnel was bored into the fault zone.

A bypass tunnel was used to avoid disrupting service through the main tunnel and to minimize cost and time. The reinforced section was excavated by first boring two drifts to either side of the planned section. The space between the two drifts was excavated, and then the drifts were filled with concrete so that if the reinforced section breaks, the water will not wash out the dirt surrounding the tunnel.

In the reinforced section, the reinforcement is weakened every  along its length to allow the reinforced section to shear predictably in the event of a slip along the fault. Up to an  offset can be accommodated without breaking the pipe or losing water delivery. The bypass tunnel was designed by Jacobs Associates for EBMUD, and cost $38 million. It went into service on May 30, 2007.

References

Wilson, S.H., R.J. Caulfield, and D.F. Tsztoo. 2006. Engineering geology of a tunnel through the Hayward Fault Zone. In Honor of Professor Edward L. Doheny, PG. Geological Society of America Abstracts with Programs 38(7).

Wilson, S.H., D.F. Tsztoo, C.R. Handford, and K. Rossi 2007. Excavation and support of a water tunnel through the Hayward Fault Zone Rapid Excavation and Tunneling Conference Proceedings, Toronto, Ontario, Canada.

Wilson, S.H., D.F. Tsztoo, C.R. Handford, and K. Rossi. 2008. Safeguarding a lifeline Civil Engineering Magazine 78(5).

External links

Papers
  ResearchGate link
 
 

Tunnels in the San Francisco Bay Area
1929 establishments in California
Transportation buildings and structures in Alameda County, California